Chhatrapati Shivaji Maharaj Jayanti, also known simply as Shiv Jayanti, is a festival and public holiday of the Indian state of Maharashtra. This festival is celebrated on February 19, celebrating the birth anniversary of Chhatrapati Shivaji Maharaj, the first Chhatrapati and founder of the Maratha Empire. He restablished Hindavi Swarajya [Hindavī Svarājya; "Self-Rule of the hindavi people"]. Some people celebrate this day as per Hindu Calendar in Maharashtra.

Date of Shiv Jayanti 
Chhatrapati Shivaji Maharaj was born at the Shivneri fort on the third day of the Krishna Paksha of the Phalgun month in the year 1551 of the Shalivahan Shaka. In the Gregorian calendar, the date generally occurs between February and March.

As per the Gregorian calendar, the date is accepted to be February 19th, 1630, but given the unscientific nature of the Gregorian calendar, many experts disagree with the date, and thus, most Hindus celebrate Shiv Jayanti as per the Hindu calendar, which is considered more accurate.

Shiv Jayanti was started by Lokmanya Bal Gangadhar Tilak, a prominent freedom fighter and a political leader.

History

In 1894, Lokmanya Bal Gangadhar Tilak started public celebration of the birth anniversary ofChhatrapati Shivaji Maharaj as 'Shiv Jayanti' to inspire the youth to become like Shivaji Maharaj, and to unite the Hindus for a national awakening. 

Along with Shiv Jayanti, Lokmanya Tilak also started public celebration of the Ganesh Chaturthi festival. Both these festivals initially began in Maharashtra, but Hindus all across India and the world celebrate them today. 

Shiv Jayanti is the birth anniversary of great Maratha ruler Shivaji Maharaj. Shivaji Maharaj was born on Marathi Shalivahana Hindu calendar Falgun's Krishna paksha 3, 1551/Julian February 19, 1630, in Shivneri Fort. The error of not converting the Julian date to the corresponding Gregorian one is still not corrected. Shivaji Maharaj is considered as the greatest Maratha ruler who carved an enclave from the declining Adilshahi sultanate of Bijapur that became the start of the Maratha Empire. At the young age of 16, Shivaji Maharaj seized the Torna fort and by the age of 17 had seized the Raigad and Kondana forts. Shivaji Maharaj as he is popularly known was named Shivaji Bhosale and was a member of the Bhonsle Maratha clan. Shivaji Maharaj promoted the use of Marathi and Sanskrit in court and administration, rather than using Persian which was the norm in those times.

References

Festivals in India
Public holidays in India
February observances
Birthdays